Wide Awake! (stylized as WIDE AWAAAAAKE!) is the sixth studio album by American indie rock band Parquet Courts, released on May 18, 2018 on Rough Trade Records.

The album was preceded by the singles "Almost Had to Start a Fight/In and Out of Patience", "Wide Awake", and "Mardi Gras Beads", and succeeded by the single "Total Football".

Background
The album was first announced in February 2018, while the album was recorded in December 2017 to January 2018 at Sonic Ranch studios outside Tornillo, Texas. The band recruited Danger Mouse to produce the album, as the band claimed, as a way to push themselves outside of their comfort zone. On recruiting Danger Mouse for the album, Andrew Savage said, "I personally liked the fact that I was writing a record that indebted to punk and funk, and Brian’s a pop producer who’s made some very polished records. I liked that it didn’t make sense."

In an interview with Billboard, Andrew Savage described the album having a funk influence saying, "there's this duality between joy and anger that I find to be really interesting, and that's something the record kind of deals with at large. I always thought it was really interesting how hardcore could be such an angry music form but could make you feel so positive. There's a lot of moments on the record when all of us are singing at the same time and I guess that's something I kind of associate with hardcore, or Funkadelic."

Critical reception

Wide Awake! received critical acclaim upon its release. At Metacritic, which assigns a normalized rating out of 100 to reviews from mainstream publications, the album received an average score of 82, based on 28 reviews, indicating "universal acclaim". In a five-star review, Emma Swan of DIY called the album, "a gut-punch of an immediate classic". Writing for Exclaim! magazine, Vish Kanna said that Wide Awake! "is a letter-perfect musical contemplation of modern times, where social uprisings are actually affecting positive change. It's urgent and potent music that's thought-provoking and danceable, and whose rage is measured by a pointed optimism." Roy Trakin, in a rave review for Variety, praised the album for its social conscience in its day and age, stating it "may be the most woke punk-rock record since the heyday of the Clash."

In a more mixed review, Chris Nelson of Mojo wrote that "unsurprisingly, it flies the Wire and Minutemen flags high. More surprising are the occasional nods to funk and '60s bubblegum."

Wide Awake! was named 'album of the year' in an end-of-year list by Australian radio station Double J and the second-best album of 2018 by Paste.

Accolades

Track listing

Personnel

Parquet Courts
 Austin Brown – guitar, vocals, keyboards on "Death Will Bring Change," "Back to Earth," and "Mardi Gras Beads"
 A. Savage – guitar, vocals, keyboards on "Violence," "Freebird II," "Before the Water Gets Too High"
 Max Savage – percussion, vocals, synthesizer on "Total Football" and "Normalization"
 Sean Yeaton – bass, vocals

Additional personnel

 Frank LoCrasto – piano on "Tenderness"
 Eleanor Adams, Minelle Jeddy, Lucie Bismuth Berger, Rita Bochi, Julian Cohen, Mia Nikov, Kofi Dufu, Ava DiFelice, Caden Castro-Kudler, and Ariane Bourdain – additional vocals on "Death Will Bring Change" 

 Danger Mouse – production
 Kennie Takahashi – engineering
 Joe LaPorta – mastering
 Claudius Mittendorfer – mixing
 Jonathan Schenke – engineering

Charts

References

External links
 Wide Awake at Rough Trade

2018 albums
Parquet Courts albums
Rough Trade Records albums
Albums produced by Danger Mouse (musician)
Albums recorded at Electric Lady Studios
Albums recorded at Sonic Ranch